Korrehi (also Romanized as Korreh’ī; also known as Korā’ī, Korranī, and Korūnī) is a village in Rahmat Rural District, Seyyedan District, Marvdasht County, Fars Province, Iran. At the 2006 census, its population was 1,170, in 291 families.

References 

Populated places in Marvdasht County